Matthias Hawdon (1732–1789) was an English composer and organist based in the East Riding of Yorkshire and Newcastle upon Tyne.

Life

He was the son of Thomas Hawdon, and christened on 24 October 1732 in All Saints' Church, Newcastle upon Tyne. He studied organ under Charles Avison.

He married Mary Browne on 6 March 1760 in Holy Trinity Church, Hull.

His son, Thomas Hawdon, was also an organist, and followed in his footsteps as organist of Holy Trinity Church, Hull in 1787.

In 1776 he returned to Newcastle after the death of Edward Avison (son of his teacher, Charles Avison) from whom he took over the promotion of a concert subscription series in the city, but this bankrupted him in 1781. He was also organist of St. Nicholas' Church, Newcastle.

Appointments

Organist at Holy Trinity Church, Hull 1751 – 1769
Organist at Beverley Minster 1769 – 1776
Organist at St. Nicholas' Church, Newcastle 1776 – 1789

Compositions

He wrote:
A new song 1755
Beauty's power 1765
Innocence and love 1770
Six conversion sonatas for the harpsichord or pianoforte, with accompaniments for two violins and violoncello, opera second 1775
Fancy sung by Mr. Morgan 1780
Two concertos: for the organ or harpsichord with instrumental parts. 1780
Six Sonatas Spirituale or Voluntaries – Opus 4, 1784

References

1732 births
1789 deaths
English organists
British male organists
English composers
18th-century composers
18th-century British male musicians
18th-century keyboardists